The Wesley Foundation at the University of Kentucky is a United Methodist campus ministry and a Christian living community for students. It's located on the University of Kentucky's campus in Lexington, Kentucky.

History
The Wesley Foundation was established in 1945 and met at the First Methodist Church on High Street.  In 1950, it moved to a small building on South Limestone.  Later, it moved to a small building on the corner of Maxwell and Limestone Streets. The Foundation used this building as its primary ministry space until 1986 when the Kentucky United Methodist Conference obtained a residential dorm from a leaving sorority at 508 Columbia Ave.  This purchase allowed the Foundation the opportunity to house 48 students in a Christian community. The dorm is believed to be the largest residential community of its kind in the United States.

Living community
The WF has two residential floors, one holding 24 women and one holding 24 men. Two members of the student leadership team serve as men's and women's RA, and share the responsibility of overseeing day-to-day aspects of the residential ministry. This living community is a vital part of the Wesley's ministry, as it serves to deepen relationships among students, provide accountability and support, and emphasize the idea of allowing your faith to inform all areas of your life.

Ministry and missions
In addition to their Christian Living Community, the Wesley is also a campus ministry that provides a weekly worship service, free dinners, events, small groups, and co-ed Bible studies. The UKWF's mission is to "connect, develop, and send a new generation of Christian leaders who will make disciples of Jesus Christ and transform the world." The WF is living out this mission by not only creating opportunities for service on campus and in the city of Lexington, but also by presenting, through the living community, constant opportunities for service and discipleship among residents.

The ministry is led by a director, an ordained minister in the United Methodist Church; an assistant director, usually a seminary student or recent graduate of the ministry; and a student leadership team, composed of 7-12 students who serve in various positions.

The Wesley hosts a weekly service, Renew takes place every Wednesday night at 7pm. Worship entails live, student-led worship, biblical teaching, and involvement in a transformational community., a message, and student-led worship. The Wesley also host a weekly Bible study, Foundations meets on Thursday nights at 7pm. Dinner is provided, followed by teaching and a discussion lesson based on a topic that is foundational to the Christian faith. The Foundation topics are things we believe our students should know in order to live as a follower of Jesus Christ. The Wesley also has Life groups which are a great way to find community and build deep, lasting relationships. Groups are divided by age and gender. Wesley Life Groups exist to support and challenge you through authentic sharing, truth telling, accountably, and prayer to help you take your next steps with God

The Wesley also hosts many events that happen every year or every semester, including Fall Retreat, Thirst, 12 Days of Christmas, Love Week, Coffee House, and most recently a campus-wide Worship Night held at UK's Singletary Center for the Arts.

The 12 Days of Christmas is their biggest service event of the year, where students have 12 different service opportunities throughout the city in the 12 days leading up to Christmas break. Historically, opportunities have included decorating at nursing homes, caroling at UK Children's Hospital, handing out cookies on campus, participating in a clothing drive for local homeless shelters, helping with Step by Step Ministries, serving hot chocolate to the homeless population downtown, and volunteering with ministries like the Ronald McDonald House, Nathaniel Mission, Love Your Melon, Hospice of the Bluegrass, Lighthouse Ministries, and others.

References

Methodism in Kentucky
United Methodist Church
History of Methodism in the United States
Student religious organizations in the United States
International student religious organizations
University of Kentucky
Fellowships